Federica Macrì (born 22 August 1990) is an Italian former artistic gymnast who competed at the 2008 Summer Olympics. She was a member of the Italian team that won the gold medal at the 2006 European Championships.

Career
Macrì began gymnastics when she was three years old at the Artistica 81 club in her hometown Trieste. Her first major international competition was the 2004 Junior European Championships. The Italian team of Macrì, Vanessa Ferrari, Francesca Benolli, and Roberta Galante won the bronze medal behind Russia and Romania. Macrì also won the bronze medal on the floor exercise behind Romanian gymnasts Steliana Nistor and Sandra Izbașa. 

Macrì was a part of the Italian team that won the gold medal at the 2005 Mediterranean Games. At the 2006 European Championships, the Italian team of Macrì, Vanessa Ferrari, Carlotta Giovannini, Monica Bergamelli, and Lia Parolari won the gold medal in the team competition. She also competed at the 2006 World Championships where the Italian team finished ninth in the qualification round. She finished fourteenth in the all-around at the 2007 European Championships. She also competed at the 2007 World Championships where the Italian team finished fourth, and Macrì finished nineteenth in the all-around final. 

Macrì was selected to compete at the 2008 Olympic Games alongside Vanessa Ferrari, Carlotta Giovannini, Lia Parolari, Francesca Benolli, and Monica Bergamelli, and they finished tenth in the qualification round. She continued to compete after the Olympic Games. She competed at the 2010 City of Jesolo Trophy and helped the Italian team win the bronze medal. At the 2010 European Championships, the Italian team of Macrì, Vanessa Ferrari, Elisabetta Preziosa, and Paola Galante finished fifth. At the 2013 City of Jesolo Trophy, the Italian team won the silver medal, and Macrì finished thirteenth in the all-around.

References

External links

 
 

1990 births
Living people
Italian female artistic gymnasts
Olympic gymnasts of Italy
Gymnasts at the 2008 Summer Olympics
Sportspeople from Trieste
European champions in gymnastics
Mediterranean Games gold medalists for Italy
Mediterranean Games medalists in gymnastics
Competitors at the 2005 Mediterranean Games